Liberty X have recorded 67 songs which were composed by either the band or external songwriters.

Released

Notes
The following tracks were not released in the UK.
 Super Hits – "Holding on For You" (B&Q Remix)
 Unreleased Third V2 Album – "Wilder", "Get Away", "Press Rewind" and "Bump & Grind"
 To Those Who Wait – "Practice What You Preach", "Greed" (Alternative Version) and "Holding on For You" (Alternative Version)
 Being Somebody (Japanese Version) – * "Tell Me What You're Doing Tonight" and "Willing To Try"
 The Hits: Reloaded – "Fresh"

References

 
Liberty X